The Grace Church Van Vorst, is located in Jersey City, Hudson County, New Jersey, United States. The church was added to the National Register of Historic Places on August 1, 1979. The church was built in 1853 and was named after the former Van Vorst Township. The church is an English Gothic-style Episcopal church which was designed by Detlef Lienau. The building is constructed with brownstone and has a slate roof. The church was expanded in 1864 with the addition of two bays to the west and a baptistry added midway on the south side of the building. The 57-foot high square tower was added in 1912. Adjacent to the church is a rectory that was also designed by Lienau in a similar style to the church.

Gallery

See also
National Register of Historic Places listings in Hudson County, New Jersey
Paul Moore - former rector of the church.

References

External links

 
 View of Grace Church Van Vorst via Google Street View

Churches in Hudson County, New Jersey
Churches on the National Register of Historic Places in New Jersey
Episcopal church buildings in New Jersey
History of Jersey City, New Jersey
Churches completed in 1853
19th-century Episcopal church buildings
Churches in Jersey City, New Jersey
National Register of Historic Places in Hudson County, New Jersey
New Jersey Register of Historic Places